Afrasura rivulosa is a moth of the subfamily Arctiinae first described by Francis Walker in 1854. It is found in the Democratic Republic of the Congo, Ethiopia, Kenya, Nigeria, South Africa and Uganda.

Subspecies
Afrasura rivulosa rivulosa
Afrasura rivulosa ethiopica Durante, 2009 (Ethiopia)

References

Moths described in 1854
rivulosa
Moths of Africa
Insects of West Africa
Insects of Uganda
Insects of Ethiopia